The 1980–81 snooker season was a series of snooker tournaments played between 18 June 1980 and 16 May 1981. The following table outlines the results for the ranking and the invitational events.


Calendar

Official rankings 

The top 16 of the world rankings.

Notes

References

External links 
 

1980
Season 1981
Season 1980